Exceptionalism is the perception or belief that a species, country, society, institution, movement, individual, or time period is "exceptional" (i.e., unusual or extraordinary). The term carries the implication, whether or not specified, that the referent is superior in some way.

Although the idea appears to have developed with respect to an era, today it is particularly applied with respect to particular nations or regions.

Other uses of the term include medical and genetic exceptionalism.

History

The German romantic philosopher-historians, especially Johann Gottfried Herder (1744–1803) and Johann Gottlieb Fichte (1762–1814), dwelt on the theme of uniqueness in the late 18th century. They de-emphasized the political state and instead emphasized the uniqueness of the Volk, comprising the whole people, their languages and traditions.  Each nation, considered as a cultural entity with its own distinctive history, possessed a "national spirit", or "soul of the people" (in German: Volksgeist).  This idea had a strong influence in the growth of nationalism in 19th-century European lands—especially in ones ruled by élites from somewhere else.

Claims of exceptionality have been made for many countries, including the United States, Australia (especially in South Australia), China, France, Germany, Greece, Pakistan, Imperial Japan, Iran, Serbia, Israel, North Korea, South Africa, Spain, the UK, the USSR, Thailand  and Lebanon. Historians have added many other cases, including historic empires such as China, the Ottoman Empire, ancient Rome, and ancient India, along with a wide range of minor kingdoms in history.

Criticism 

Belief in exceptionalism can represent erroneous thought analogous to historicism in that it overemphasizes peculiarities in an analysis and ignores or downplays meaningful comparisons . A group may assert exceptionalism in order to exaggerate the appearance of difference, to invoke a wider latitude of action, and to avoid recognition of similarities that would reduce perceived justifications . This can be an example of special pleading, a form of spurious argumentation that ignores relevant bases for meaningful comparisons . Exceptionalism is often based on poor historical knowledge.

Separateness 
J. Bradford DeLong has used the term "exceptionalism" to describe the economic growth of post-World War II Western Europe.

Exceptionalism can represent an error analogous to historicism in assuming that only peculiarities are relevant to analysis, while overlooking meaningful comparisons. Political scientist Noritada Matsuda writes, "[W]hat is seemingly exceptional in one country may be found in other countries."

In ideologically-driven debates, a group may assert exceptionalism, with or without the term, in order to exaggerate the appearance of difference, perhaps to create an atmosphere permissive of a wider latitude of action, and to avoid recognition of similarities that would reduce perceived justifications. If unwarranted, this represents an example of special pleading, a form of spurious argumentation that ignores relevant bases for meaningful comparison.

The term "exceptionalism" can imply criticism of a tendency to remain separate from others. For example, the reluctance of the United States government to join various international treaties is sometimes called "exceptionalist".

Medical exceptionalism
Use of the term "HIV exceptionalism" implies that AIDS is a contagious disease that is or should be treated differently from other contagions or entails benefits not available to those suffering from other diseases.

See also
Instances of exceptionalism:
 American exceptionalism (United States of America)
Chinese exceptionalism
 Chosen people (multiple nations)
 Christ of Europe (Poland)
 God's Own Country (multiple nations)
 Holy Rus (Russia)
 Nihonjinron (Japan)
 Sonderweg (Germany)

Related terms:
 Anthropocentrism
 Chauvinism
 Civilizing mission
 Cultural exception
 Grandiosity
 Great Divergence
 Historic recurrence
 Jingoism
 Rare Earth hypothesis
 Third Rome

Notes

References
 George M. Fredrickson. "From Exceptionalism to Variability: Recent Developments in Cross-National Comparative History," Journal of American History, Vol. 82, No. 2 (Sep., 1995), pp. 587–604 in JSTOR
 Gallant, Thomas W. "Greek Exceptionalism and Contemporary Historiography: New Pitfalls and Old Debates," Journal of Modern Greek Studies, Volume 15, Number 2, October 1997, pp. 209–16 
 Michael Kammen, "The Problem of American Exceptionalism: A Reconsideration," American Quarterly, Vol. 45, No. 1 (Mar., 1993), pp. 1–43 in JSTOR
  Seymour Martin Lipset, American Exceptionalism: A Double-Edged Sword (1996)
 Lund, Joshua. "Barbarian Theorizing and the Limits of Latin American Exceptionalism," Cultural Critique, 47, Winter 2001, pp. 54–90 in Project Muse
 Pei, Minxin. "The Puzzle of East Asian Exceptionalism," Journal of Democracy, Volume 5, Number 4, October 1994, pp. 90–103 
 Thompson, Eric C. "Singaporean Exceptionalism and Its Implications for ASEAN Regionalism," Contemporary Southeast Asia, Volume 28, Number 2, August 2006, pp. 183–206.

Further reading
 Greg Grandin, "The Strange Career of American Exceptionalism", The Nation, January 2/9, 2017, pp. 22–27.

Comparative politics
Critical theory
Nationalism
International relations theory